Viskear is a village in Southern Bulgaria. The village is located in Pernik Municipality, Pernik Province. Аccording to the numbers provided by the 2020 Bulgarian census, Viskear currently has a population of 89 people with a permanent address registration in the settlement.

Geography 
Viskear village is located on the border between Sofia and Pernik Municipalities, and it lies in the foot of Viskear mountain. 

The mountain is low with the highest peak Mechi Kamak (1077m).

Viskear village is located 15 kilometers northwest of Pernik and 9 kilometers southeast of Breznik. Moreover, it is 10 kilometers northwest of Rasnik, while the capital Sofia lies 45 kilometers to the east.

The village is located at a high elevation with an average of 784 meters above sea level.

The climate above 800 meters in the village is mountain climate, while below 800 meters is continental.

Others 
There are 28 historical Thracian mounds near the village, which during 2006 Simeon Sakskoburgotski ordered it to become the site of a quarry and be destroyed. The local city council ruled against it and a massive outbreak took place. In the end, the municipality managed to preserve the historical mounts of national significance.

Ethnicity 
According to the Bulgarian population census in 2011.

References 

Villages in Pernik Province